Nursipalu training area is one of the six military training fields used by the Estonian Defence Forces. It is located in Võru and Rõuge municipalities in Võru County.

History 
During the Soviet occupation of Estonia, Nursipalu training area was part of the Soviet Army Visnevski military-campus and training area for Soviet Airborne Troops and missile brigade with the area of 3,703 ha.

Establishment 
Nursipalu training area was established on 14 February 2008, with the Government Order No. 79 "Establishment of the Defense Forces Nursipalu training area and handing over the state property."

See also 
Keskpolügoon

References 

Military installations of Estonia
Rõuge Parish
Võru Parish
Military education and training in the Soviet Union
Military installations of the Soviet Union